Anton Vratuša (born Vratussa Antal; 21 February 1915 – 30 July 2017) was a Slovenian politician and diplomat who was Prime Minister of Slovenia from 1978 to 1980, and Yugoslavia's ambassador to the United Nations.

Life 

Vratuša was born in Alsócsalogány, Austria-Hungary, today Dolnji Slaveči, Slovenia. His parents were Vratussa Antal and Anna Bokán. He passed the exam for becoming a teacher of stenography. He defended his Doctorate Thesis in the field of Slavistics at the Faculty of philosophy in Ljubljana in the year 1941.

After the outbreak of the World War II in Yugoslavia, Vratuša joined the Yugoslav Partisans, but was interned in the Italian concentration camps of Gonars, of Treviso, of Padova and of Rab from February 1942 to September 1943. After the concentration camp at Rab was liberated by the Partisans, Vratuša was named Deputy Commander of their Rab battalion, made up of camp survivors. He was also the head of the Yugoslav Partisans' delegation at the National Liberation Committee, the Italian Partisans' underground political entity during the German occupation of Italy in the last years of World War II.

After the war, he pursued an academic and diplomatic career. He was Chief of Staff to Edvard Kardelj (1953–65) and Yugoslavia's ambassador to the United Nations (1967–69). From April 1978 to July 1980, he was the Prime Minister of the Yugoslav Socialist Republic of Slovenia. He was also a member of the Slovenian Academy of Sciences and Arts.

He helped to found the International Center for Promotion of Enterprises, formerly known as the International Center for Public Enterprises in Developing Countries, and later served as the Honorary President of its Council.

Publications
Vratuša's published works include The Commune in Yugoslavia (1965) and Prospects of the Non-Aligned Movement (1981). From 1985 until 1988, he wrote various UN publications, especially in the fields of the law of the sea and politics in developing countries.

Death
Vratuša died on 30 July 2017 at the age of 102.

References

External links

 
 "Survivors of war camp lament Italy's amnesia"  
 Biography at the Slovenian Academy of Sciences and Arts (in Slovene)

1915 births
2017 deaths
People from the Municipality of Grad
League of Communists of Slovenia politicians
Presidents of the Executive Council of the Socialist Republic of Slovenia
Permanent Representatives of Yugoslavia to the United Nations
Slovenian people of World War II
Yugoslav Partisans members
Slovenian communists
Ethnic Slovene people
Rab concentration camp survivors
Slovenian centenarians
Men centenarians
Slovenian people of Hungarian descent